Nasimul Alam Chowdhury is a Bangladeshi politician and the incumbent Member of the Bangladesh Parliament from Comilla-8.

Early life 
Chowdhury was born on 31 July 1967. He studied up to a H.S.C. degree.

Career
Chowdhury was elected to Parliament from Comilla-8 as a Bangladesh Awami League candidate in 2009 and served till 2014.

Chowdhury was re-elected on 30 December 2018 as an Awami League candidate. He had received 188,659 votes while his nearest rival, Jakaria Taher Shumon of Bangladesh Nationalist Party, received 34,219 votes. He was appointed to the parliamentary standing committee on the railway ministry.

References

Living people
9th Jatiya Sangsad members
11th Jatiya Sangsad members
Awami League politicians
1967 births